Francis Joseph Klein (born 1911 in Sedley, Saskatchewan) was a Canadian Catholic clergyman and prelate for the Diocese of Saskatoon, and later for Calgary. He was appointed bishop in 1952. He died in 1968.

References 

1911 births
1968 deaths
Canadian Roman Catholic bishops